Asan Woori Bank WooriWON is a South Korean professional basketball club playing in the Women's Korean Basketball League.

Honours

Women's Korean Basketball League 

WKBL Championship
 Winners (11): 2003 (winter), 2003 (summer), 2005 (winter), 2006 (winter), 2012–13, 2013–14, 2014–15, 2015–16, 2016–17, 2017–18, 2019–20
 Runners-up (4): 1999 (winter), 2001 (winter), 2005 (summer), 2021–22

WKBL Regular Season
 Winners (13): 1999 (winter), 2003 (winter), 2005 (winter), 2005 (summer), 2006 (winter), 2012–13, 2013–14, 2014–15, 2015–16, 2016–17, 2017–18, 2019–20, 2020–21
 Runners-up (3): 2007 (winter), 2018–19, 2021–22

External links
 Official website 

Basketball teams established in 1958
Basketball teams in South Korea
Women's basketball teams in South Korea
Women's Korean Basketball League teams
Sport in South Chungcheong Province
Asan
1958 establishments in South Korea